Herbert Brodkin (November 9, 1912 – October 29, 1990) was an American producer and director of film and television.

Brodkin was best known as the producer of the television shows Playhouse 90, The Defenders, the miniseries Holocaust and the short-lived series Coronet Blue.

Brodkin was also the founder and president of Plautus Productions and also the co-founder of Titus Productions with Robert Berger in 1965.

Early life and education

Brodkin was born to a Jewish family on November 9, 1912 in New York City, the youngest of six children born to parents Adolph (1873 – 1946) and Rose (Hunter) Brodkin. Brodkin's parents were both born in Russia. His father immigrated from Russia in 1887 and his mother in 1894. Brodkin had two older brothers; Nathanal and Milton (1904–1970), and three older sisters; Gertrude, Ethel, and Beatrice.

Brodkin graduated from the University of Michigan with a B.A. in 1934 and from the Yale School of Drama in 1940.

Career

Broadway

Brodkin started his career as a scenic designer of the 1947 Broadway drama O'Daniel. He was also the scenic designer of many other plays. Eventually, Brodkin would be the production manager of the plays Texas, Li'l Darlin, (1949), and Something About a Soldier, (1962).

Television

Brodkin began his career in television in 1950 as a set designer at CBS. Brodkin achieved recognition a few years later and became a producer for many anthology programs of the 1950s including The Elgin Hour, The Alcoa Hour, Goodyear Television Playhouse, and Studio One.

Playhouse 90 was one of Brodkin's most memorable production credits. Beginning in 1956, the series was able to put Brodkin's expertise in the theatrical arts at work. The series ended in 1960. Another one of Brodkin's memorable production credits was the 1960s courtroom drama The Defenders. The series starred E.G. Marshall and Robert Reed as a father-and-son defense attorney team who, under the production of Brodkin, dealt with subjects such as euthanasia and blacklisting, subjects which, at the time, were very touchy for television. Brodkin also became famous for his use of close-ups and fast cuts in the series.

Some of the other television series that Brodkin produced were Brenner, The Nurses, and Coronet Blue, (all for CBS), Shane (for ABC), and Espionage (for NBC).

Film

Brodkin also produced several films throughout his career.

One of those films include the 1981 movie Skokie. Skokie was the true story of constitutional rights in Illinois. The movie's plot was based on the real life NSPA Controversy of Skokie, Illinois in the late 1970s which involved the National Socialist Party of America. The movie starred Danny Kaye.

Plautus Productions/Titus Productions

In 1959, Brodkin founded  and became the president of Plautus Productions. The company was responsible for series such as  Brenner, The Defenders, The Nurses, Espionage and Coronet Blue. The production company closed in 1967.

In 1965, Brodkin, along with producer Robert Berger founded Titus Productions. Titus Productions served as the production company for many of the TV shows and films that Brodkin produced including the 1978 miniseries Holocaust, and the movies Skokie and Mandela. The company was acquired by the Taft Entertainment Company in 1981. The studio defunct in 1989.

Personal life

Brodkin was married once to Patricia M. Brodkin (May 3, 1917–April 1, 1983)

Death

Brodkin died on October 29, 1990 in New York City, New York at the Mount Sinai Hospital. He died of an aneurysm at the age of 77. He was eleven days shy of his 78th birthday.

He was preceded in death by his wife Patricia Brodkin. He was survived by his two daughters; Lucinda D. and Brigit A. Brodkin. He was also survived by two older sisters; Pat Cutler, and Beatrice Forrest.

Legacy and Honors

At Brodkin's alma mater, Yale School of Drama there are two scholarship and graduate programs established by Brodkin. They are The Herbert H. and Patricia M. Brodkin Scholarship and The Patricia M. Brodkin Memorial Scholarship.

The Herbert H. and Patricia M. Brodkin Scholarship was established by Herbert and Patricia Brodkin in 1963. The program is given to an outstanding student selected by the faculty of the school. The Patricia M. Brodkin Memorial Scholarship was established in 1983 by Herbert Brodkin, associates and friends in memory of his recently deceased wife Patricia. The program is awarded to a student of the school.

Brodkin was posthumously inducted into the Television Academy Hall of Fame in 1999. Other inductees that year included Carl Reiner, Fred Rogers, and Fred Silverman.

Awards and nominations

 1956: Nominated Emmy as Best Producer of a Live Television Series for The Alcoa Hour and Goodyear Television Playhouse (NBC). 
 1968: Nominated Emmy as Outstanding Dramatic Program for CBS Playhouse (CBS).
 1969: Nominated Emmy as Outstanding Dramatic Program for CBS Playhouse (CBS).
 1975: Nominated Emmy as Outstanding Special - Drama or Comedy for The Missiles of October. Shared with Irv Wilson and Robert Berger (ABC).
 1978: Won Emmy as Outstanding Producer of a Limited Series for Holocaust. Shared with Robert Berger (NBC).
 1982: Nominated Emmy as Outstanding Drama Special for Skokie (CBS).
 1987: Won ACE as Movie or Miniseries for Murrow.
 1989: Nominated ACE as Movie or Miniseries for Mandela (HBO).

Filmography

Film

Sebastian (1968) (Producer)
The People Next Door (1970) (Producer)

Television

References

External links

The Herbert Brodkin Television Production Files. Yale Collection of American Literature, Beinecke Rare Book and Manuscript Library.

1912 births
1990 deaths
International Emmy Founders Award winners
University of Michigan alumni
American people of Russian-Jewish descent
Yale School of Drama alumni